The Azerbaijan Golf Challenge Open was a golf tournament on the Challenge Tour. It was first played in August 2014 at the National Azerbaijan Golf Club in Quba, Azerbaijan. It was the first professional golf tournament in Azerbaijan.

Winners

References

External links
Coverage on the Challenge Tour's official site

Former Challenge Tour events
Sport in Azerbaijan
2014 establishments in Azerbaijan